Škrjanče is a small settlement in the Municipality of Mirna in southeastern Slovenia. It lies west of Mirna in the traditional region of Lower Carniola. The area is now included in the Southeast Slovenia Statistical Region.

References

External links
Škrjanče on Geopedia

Populated places in the Municipality of Mirna